The Lioré et Olivier LéO 21 was a 1920s French biplane airliner and later military transport based on the earlier LéO 20 night bomber.

Development
First flown in August 1929 the LéO  21 was a twin-engined biplane airliner with a fixed tailskid landing gear. It retained the basic structure of the LéO 20 night bomber but with a new wider fuselage. It had room for six passengers in a nose cabin and a further 12 passengers in the main cabin with an open cockpit for the pilot.

The second LéO 21 was fitted with two 450 hp (336 kW) Renault 12Ja engines and re-designated as a LéO 212. It was converted by the Wagons-Lits company as a dining aircraft. The first LéO 21 became an avion-bar in 1929 and was re-designated LéO 211; it was later modified in 1931 with Renault engines as the LéO 213. One aircraft was produced as the LéO 21S fitted as a 10-stretcher ambulance. The first production LéO 213 was built in 1928 and a total of eleven were built and operated by Air Union on routes from Paris to London, Lyons, Marseilles and Geneva. The LéO 213 had an increased wingspan, improved sound proofing and three baggage holds. When modified for night services they were re-designated as LéO 213N. In 1934 all the surviving LéO 213s were bought by the Armée de l'Air (French Air Force) and were converted to transports for 14-troops on bench seats and re-designated LéO 214.

Variants
LeO 21
Prototype powered by 2x  Gnome & Rhône 9Ab Jupiter engines
LeO 211
First prototype modified
LeO 212
Second prototype fitted with 2x  Renault 12Ja engines. 
LeO 213
Production version with Renault 12Ja engines, some redesignated LéO 213N for night use.
LeO 214
Military conversions from LéO 213 for the Armée de l'Air.
LeO 21S
Air ambulance, one built.

Accidents and incidents
On 25 July 1930, LeO 21 F-AIZO Golden Ray/Rayon dOr of Air Union made a forced landing at Snave, Kent following an engine failure. The aircraft was subsequently dismantled and removed to Hythe, Kent.

Operators

Air Union
French Air Force

Spanish Republican Air Force - Lioré et Olivier 213

Specifications (LeO 214)

See also

References

 

1920s French airliners
21
Biplanes
Twin piston-engined tractor aircraft
Aircraft first flown in 1926